Jason James Desiata Dy (born June 19, 1990) is a Filipino singer, songwriter,  actor and musician. He is best known as the winner of the second season of The Voice of the Philippines.

Dy was invited onstage by David Foster to perform with him during his HitMan tour at the Smart Araneta Coliseum, Manila, August 18, 2015.  Dy sang "I Have Nothing" with Foster on piano.

Dy's eponymous album, Jason Dy, was released by MCA Universal on September 4, 2015. "Caught in that Feeling", "Milagro", and "Walang Iwanan" were released as singles. A deluxe edition with additional original compositions was released October 2016.

March 2017, Dy received a gold record award from MCA Music for his Jason Dy album at a celebration at Robinson's Galleria.  Edray Teodoro and Micka Gorospe performed his songs Caught In That Feeling and Break My Heart.

In May 2017, Dy went on a Malaysian promo tour for his latest single "Nothing Like Cinta Ini" with Malaysian singer Fazura.  "Nothing Like Cinta Ini" is the Malaysian version of Dy's single "Nothing Like Pag-Ibig" written by Jungee Marcelo.

Dy is currently a regular performer at ABS-CBN's Sunday variety show ASAP. He is a part of the group ASAP Soul Sessions alongside fellow R&B artists, Kyla, Jay R, KZ Tandingan, and Daryl Ong.

Dy is a member of the R&B vocal trio SoulJa with Jaya and Jay R.

Biography

Early life and education
Jason Dy was born on June 19, 1990, in Cebu City, Philippines but was raised by his parents in Butuan City. In 2003, his parents separated; they were granted an annulment in 2014. Jason lived with his mother until she needed to leave for Singapore to find work. He finished primary school at Enfant Cheri Study Centre Butuan City, high school at Father Saturnino Urios University and earned a Bachelor's degree in Popular Music at Philippine Women's University.

To support himself, Dy started working as a "haranista". He serenades women in different places of their boyfriends or suitors. He also recorded demo tracks, including the original soundtrack of the 2013 film Bakit Hindi Ka Crush ng Crush Mo?, which was re-recorded by Xian Lim for his XL2 album, as well as "Kontrabida" and "Nasa 'Yo Na Ang Lahat" by Sam Concepcion and Daniel Padilla, respectively. He also uploaded covers on YouTube, and composing an original song entitled "2 Have U".

Music career

2014–present: The Voice of the Philippines
During the second season auditions for ABS-CBN's The Voice of the Philippines, which aired on November 9, 2014, Dy performed Sam Smith's "Stay with Me". Coaches Sarah Geronimo, Lea Salonga, and Apl.de.ap all voted for him, stating that he was able to bring out the emotion of the song through his falsetto skills. Although Bamboo Mañalac did not turn for him, Mañalac expressed that it "was a great performance". Dy eventually chose Geronimo to coach him, as he believed that she would be able to help him build a career in the music industry.

Dy advanced to the finals after winning against Monique Lualhati during the two-part semi-finals stage live at the Newport Performing Arts Theater in Resorts World Manila. He received both the highest votes given by his coach and the viewers' text votes, totaling 60.10% of the combined votes. He then performed a duet with Charice during the first set of the finals night, singing the song "Wrecking Ball", and later sang "With You" for his solo performance. Both songs received praises from the coaches. Apl.de.ap commented, "Amazing job, you have grown so much in this competition. I've seen you dance, do all kinds of different things. Congratulations with that performance".

Along with Alisah Bonaobra, Dy advanced to the second round on the second night of the finale after garnering one of the two highest votes from the public. Subsequently, he won against Bonaobra, receiving 52.94% of the text votes, not including the votes from the first round. He was proclaimed the winner at the end of the competition, winning 2 million pesos, a house and lot from Camella Homes, and a recording and managing contract with MCA Music, among other prizes. His winning song, "Minsan Lang Kita Iibigin", received praises from his coach, Geronimo, who commented, "That is Jason, that is special about Jason. He is the voice of today, he is a world-class talent, and his voice deserves to be heard all over the world". Coincidentally, both Dy and Geronimo became champions on the same day, March 1.

Appearances

Television

Discography

As a demo artist
Bakit Hindi Ka Crush ng Crush Mo? OST, 2013 (recorded by Xian Lim)
"Kontrabida", 2013 (recorded by Sam Concepcion)
"Nasa 'Yo Na Ang Lahat", 2013 (recorded by Daniel Padilla)
"Ikaw Na", 2014 (recorded by Jed Madela)

As a lead artist

Studio albums
 All About Me, 2013
 Jason Dy, 2015
 Jason Dy (Deluxe), 2016

Singles
Caught in that Feeling, 2015
Milagro, 2015
Walang Iwanan, 2016
Nothing Like Pag-ibig, 2017
Nothing Like Cinta Ini with Fazura, 2017
Pano Na Lang Ako, 2017
Tayo Na Lang Kasi with Kyla, 2017
Diyan Ba Sa Langit with Morissette and KIKX, 2019
Gusto Ko Pa with Jay R, 2020
Piliin ang Pag-ibig with Soc Villanueva, 2021

Accolades

References

External links

1990 births
Living people
People from Butuan
21st-century Filipino male singers
Filipino male pop singers
People from Agusan del Norte
Star Magic
Filipino people of Chinese descent
The Voice of the Philippines contestants
The Voice (franchise) winners
MCA Music Inc. (Philippines) artists